"Without You" is a song performed by Charlie Wilson, issued as the lead single from his 2000 album Bridging the Gap. It was his first solo single since 1992's "Sprung on Me", and it peaked at #26 on the Billboard R&B chart.

Chart positions

References

External links
 
 

2000 songs
2000s ballads
2000 singles
Charlie Wilson (singer) songs
Contemporary R&B ballads
Interscope Records singles
Songs written by Traci Hale
Songs written by Laney Stewart